The 1902 NYU Violets football team was an American football team that represented New York University as an independent during the 1902 college football season. In their second year under head coach W. H. Rorke, the team compiled a 5–3 record.

Schedule

References

NYU
NYU Violets football seasons
NYU Violets football